HN1 or HN-1 may refer to:

 HN1 (gene), a human gene
 HN1 (nitrogen mustard), bis(2-chloroethyl)ethylamine, a chemical warfare agent
 HN-1, a Chinese Hongniao series rocket